Morand may refer to:

 Morand, Indre-et-Loire, France
 Marand, Iran

People with the surname